Charsadda railway station is located in Charsadda, Khyber Pakhtunkhwa, Pakistan. The station is last station on Mardan–Charsadda Branch Line. It is being proposed to connect the station with Peshawar railway station for the Peshawar Circular Railway.

See also
 List of railway stations in Pakistan
 Pakistan Railways

References

Railway stations in Charsadda District
Defunct railway stations in Pakistan